The red-eared fruit dove (Ptilinopus fischeri) is a species of bird in the pigeon family. It is endemic to the island of Sulawesi, Indonesia.

Distribution 
Its natural habitat is subtropical or tropical moist montane forests. They are found at elevations between 1,000 - 3,000m.

Subspecies 
There are three subspecies of the red-eared fruit dove:

 Ptilinopus fischeri fischeri (Found in north Sulawesi)
 Ptilinopus fischeri centralis (Found in central and southeastern Sulawesi)
 Ptilinopus fischeri meridionalis (Found in southwest Sulawesi)

Status 
It is listed as least concern by the IUCN although their populations are currently decreasing.

See also 

 Lompobattang fruit-dove - a similar species
 Fauna of Indonesia
 List of least concern birds

References 

Ptilinopus
Birds described in 1876
Endemic birds of Sulawesi
Taxonomy articles created by Polbot
Taxobox binomials not recognized by IUCN